The 2008 Illinois State Redbirds football team represented Illinois State University as a member of the Missouri Valley Football Conference (MVFC) during the 2008 NCAA Division I FCS football season. Led by Denver Johnson in his ninth and final season as head coach, the Redbirds compiled an overall record of 3–8 with a mark of 2–6 in conference play, placing eighth in the MVFC. Illinois State played home games at Hancock Stadium in Normal, Illinois.

After the team's final game, a loss to Southern Illinois, Johnson resigned from the head coaching position.

Schedule

References

Illinois State
Illinois State Redbirds football seasons
Illinois State Redbirds football